The 2007–08 FIS Cross-Country World Cup was a multi-race tournament over the season for cross-country skiers. It was the 27th official World Cup season in cross-country skiing for men and women. The season began on 27 October 2007 with 800m sprint races for women in Düsseldorf, won by Natalia Matveeva of Russia, who took her first World Cup victory. The season concluded with World Cup Finals, a mini-tour held in Bormio, Italy. Finnish skier Virpi Kuitunen won the overall women's cup for the 2nd consecutive season and Lukáš Bauer of Czech Republic won the overall men's cup. The World Cup is organised by the FIS who also run world cups and championships in ski jumping, snowboarding and alpine skiing amongst others.

Calendar 
Both men's and women's events tend to be held at the same resorts over a 2 or 3 day period. Listed below is a list of races which equates with the points table further down this page.

The Tour de Ski is a series of events which count towards the World Cup. This starts with the meet at Nové Město and concludes at Val di Fiemme.

Men

Women

Men's team

Women's team

World Cup points 

The table shows the number of points won in the 2007–08 Cross-Country Skiing World Cup for men and women.

A skier's best results in 18 distance races and 9 sprint races counts towards the overall World Cup totals.

All distance races, included individual stages in Tour de Ski (which counts as 50% of a normal race) and the total World Cup Final, count towards the distance standings. All sprint races, including the sprint races during the Tour de Ski (which counts as 50% of a normal race) and the first race of the World Cup final, count towards the sprint standings.

The Nations Cup ranking is calculated by adding each country's individual competitors' scores and scores from team events. Relay events count double (see World Cup final positions), with only one team counting towards the total, while in team sprint events two teams contribute towards the total, with the usual World Cup points (100 to winning team, etc.) awarded.

Men's standings

Overall

Distance

Sprint

Women's standings

Overall

Distance

Sprint

Nations Cup

Overall

Men

Women

Achievements
Victories in this World Cup (all-time number of victories as of 2007/08 season in parentheses)

Men
 , 7 (10) first places
 , 2 (8) first places
 , 2 (5) first places
 , 2 (2) first places
 , 1 (12) first place
 , 1 (12) first place
 , 1 (9) first place
 , 1 (8) first place
 , 1 (5) first place
 , 1 (4) first place
 , 1 (3) first place
 , 1 (3) first place
 , 1 (2) first place
 , 1 (2) first place
 , 1 (1) first place
 , 1 (1) first place
 , 1 (1) first place
 , 1 (1) first place
 , 1 (1) first place
 , 1 (1) first place
 , 1 (1) first place
 , 1 (1) first place

Women
 , 8 (22) first places
 , 4 (4) first places
 , 3 (7) first places
 , 3 (5) first places
 , 3 (3) first places
 , 2 (31) first places
 , 2 (2) first places
 , 1 (3) first place
 , 1 (2) first place
 , 1 (2) first place
 , 1 (2) first place
 , 1 (1) first place
 , 1 (1) first place

Footnotes

References

 
FIS Cross-Country World Cup seasons
World Cup 2007-08
World Cup 2007-08